Constantin Teodorescu may refer to 

Constantin Teodorescu (general) (1863–1942), Romanian World War I military general
Constantin C. Teodorescu (1892–1972), Romanian engineer